

123001–123100 

|-bgcolor=#f2f2f2
| colspan=4 align=center | 
|}

123101–123200 

|-id=120
| 123120 Peternewman ||  || Peter R. Newman (born 1954), British astronomer with the Sloan Digital Sky Survey || 
|}

123201–123300 

|-id=290
| 123290 Manoa ||  || Manoa valley, on the island of Oahu, where the University of Hawai'i was founded in 1907 (the provisional designation's subscript stands for the university's centennial celebration of 2007) || 
|}

123301–123400 

|-bgcolor=#f2f2f2
| colspan=4 align=center | 
|}

123401–123500 

|-bgcolor=#f2f2f2
| colspan=4 align=center | 
|}

123501–123600 

|-bgcolor=#f2f2f2
| colspan=4 align=center | 
|}

123601–123700 

|-id=647
| 123647 Tomáško ||  || Tomáš Kušnirák (born 2002), the only child of the Slovak discoverers Peter Kušnirák and Ulrika Babiaková || 
|}

123701–123800 

|-id=794
| 123794 Deadwood ||  || The rowdy mining camp of Deadwood, South Dakota, was founded in 1876 during the Black Hills Gold Rush, and was home to many colorful western characters including Wild Bill Hickok, Calamity Jane, and Seth Bullock. Name suggested by the Deadwood High School Class of 1961. || 
|}

123801–123900 

|-id=818
| 123818 Helenzier ||  || Helen Zier (born 1938), American amateur astronomer, birder and volunteer in several scientific research programs || 
|-id=852
| 123852 Jánboďa ||  || Ján Boda (born 1956), Slovak geophysicist and senior lecturer at the Comenius University in Bratislava || 
|-id=860
| 123860 Davederrick || 2001 DX || David Derrick (born 1952), American educator, who built a private planetarium, space museum and observatory || 
|}

123901–124000 

|-bgcolor=#f2f2f2
| colspan=4 align=center | 
|}

References 

122001-123000